GeckoLinux is a Linux distribution based on openSUSE. It is available in two editions: Static, which is based on openSUSE Leap, and Rolling, which is based on openSUSE Tumbleweed.

Features 
Some of GeckoLinux's features include:

 "improved" font rendering
 live ISO's with various desktop environments
 offline calamares installer
 PackageKit is not used or installed by default
 pre-configured Packman repository  
 proprietary media codecs & drivers are pre-installed
 recommended packages are not forcefully installed as recommended dependencies after installation
 TLP for power management

Version history

Static

Rolling

Reception 
Dedoimedo wrote a non-positive review of GeckoLinux 150.180616, saying that it had "issues with multimedia playback, visual glitches and the graphics driver". A subsequent review of GeckoLinux Static 152 in February 2021 was more positive.

Jack M. Germain explains how & why "GeckoLinux doing for the OpenSuse/Suse world much of what Linux Mint did for the Ubuntu universe".

Gallery

Notes

See also 
 openSUSE
 Rolling release

References

External links 
 

Linux distributions
RPM-based Linux distributions
X86-64 Linux distributions
Rolling Release Linux distributions